
Strick may refer to:

 Stricklin or Stick, a member of hip hop group eMC
 Strick Shofner (1919–1998), American baseball player
 Strick, American rapper from North Carolina

Family name 
 Charles Strick (1858–1933), American baseball player
 Joseph Strick (1923–2010), American director, producer and screenwriter
 Maria Strick (née Becq; 1577–after 1631), Dutch schoolmistress and calligrapher
  (1769–1819), Dutch diplomat
 Wesley Strick (born 1954), American screenwriter

See also 
 
 Stricker
 Strickland (surname)

References 

Germanic-language surnames
Dutch-language surnames
Informal personal names

Occupational surnames